Ramatu Tijani Aliyu  (born 12 June 1970) is a Nigerian politician from Kogi State, Nigeria. She is the Minister of State for Federal Capital Territory (FCT)  appointed by president Muhammadu Buhari on August 21, 2019. Ramatu was previously the National Woman Leader of the All Nigeria Peoples Party (ANPP) later All Progressive Congress (APC) after the party and other political parties merged (2014 - 2018).

She has supported the incumbent president Muhammadu Buhari during his presidential campaigns, where she criticised the opposition candidate in 2019 election, Alhaji Atiku Abubakar of not bringing anything important to the development of the country while he was the vice president of Nigeria, and called on Nigerians not to expect anything from him as he has nothing to offer again. She was previously elected the president of the Council of African Political Parties.

Early life and family
Ramatu Tijjani Aliyu, née Sidi Ali, was born on 12 June 1970 in Wuse, Abuja, Nigeria. 
 She is the daughter of  late Alhaji Mamman Sidi Ali, who was the Bawan Allah of Lokoja in Kogi state, Nigeria, royal title he held until his death. Ramatu started her early  childhood education at Dawaki primary school Suleja in 1976 and in 1982 after she finished her primary school she enrolled for her secondary education at Federal government college (FGC) Minna, Niger state and finished in 1988. Two years later after a successful completion of her remedial program, Ramatu got admitted into Ahmadu Bello University, Zaria for her undergraduate program to study Urban and Regional Planning, She graduated in 1995 with Bachelor of Science degree (B.Sc) Urban and Regional Planning, after which Ramatu went to Nasarawa State University, Keffi, and completed her master's degree in Public Administration. She was conferred with honorary doctorate degree (Ph.D) in Public Administration by the  Commonwealth University, London and also earned a certificate in Leadership Skills from the Abbey College, London.

Career and Politics
Ramatu first started her work life after she was mobilized to serve a compulsory national service, National Youth Service Corps (NYSC) at the Federal ministry of works and housing. Young Ramatu later joint AZAH Intermediaries Nigeria Limited, a civil engineering construction firm, where she worked as Managing Director for some years, but she later went back to university where she done her master's degree and Certificate in Leadership Skills and currently undergoing a PH.D program.

In 2004, Aliyu was appointed special adviser on Women affairs, Youth and Social Development to the chairman of the Gwagwalada area council, Federal Capital Territory (FCT)  Abuja, Nigeria. In 2007, she ran for political office to represent Kwali/Abaji federal constituency in the Nigeria National Assembly (NASS) but her bid was unsuccessful, later a year in 2008, she was appointed vice national chairman of her party, which was the major opposition political party in Nigeria at the time, All Nigeria Peoples Party(ANPP) which she served as the overseer North Central Zone. In 2010 she was given the national woman leader of the  party, and concurrently served as the president of the Council of African Political Parties (CAPP) after she successful contested and won the election which took place in Khartoum, Sudan. And in 2014, after three opposition political parties in Nigeria merged into one, including her own party ANPP, she was appointed the women leader of the new party All Progressives Congress (APC), which she served until 2018.

Personal life
Ramatu Tijjani Aliyu is married to Alhaji Ahmed Tijjani Aliyu, a banker and philanthropist. Together they have three children. She is also running an NGO and founded the Global Women and Youth Empowerment Strategy (GLOWYES).

References

Living people
1970 births
All Nigeria Peoples Party politicians
All Progressives Congress politicians
Buhari administration personnel
People from Kogi State
21st-century Nigerian women politicians
21st-century Nigerian politicians
Ahmadu Bello University alumni
Nigerian women environmentalists